Kagbeni is a village in the Baragubg Muktikshetra rural municipality of Mustang District (Upper Mustang) of the Himalayas, in Nepal, located in the valley of the Kali Gandaki River. At the time of the 2011 Nepal census it had a population of 555 people.
It lies on the trail from Jomsom to the royal capital Lo Manthang, near the junction with the trail to Muktinath. Kagbeni is also regarded as one of the oldest villages in the Himalayas.

Gallery

See also
Jomsom Airport
Kali Gandaki River
Mustang District
Upper Mustang

References

External links
UN map of the municipalities of Mustang District

Populated places in Mustang District